The 1948 NCAA Swimming and Diving Championships  were contested in March 1948 at the Intramural Sports Building at the University of Michigan in Ann Arbor, Michigan at the 12th annual NCAA-sanctioned swim meet to determine the team and individual national champions of men's collegiate swimming and diving in the United States. 

Hosts Michigan topped three-time defending champions, and rivals, Ohio State in the team standings, capturing the Wolverines' sixth national title.

Team results
Note: Top 10 only
(H) = Hosts
Full results

See also
List of college swimming and diving teams

References

NCAA Division I Men's Swimming and Diving Championships
NCAA Swimming And Diving Championships
NCAA Swimming And Diving Championships
Sports in Ann Arbor, Michigan